Stirling was an electoral district of the Legislative Assembly in the Australian state of Western Australia from 1950 to 2008.

The district was located in the Great Southern region of Western Australia.

Geography
Stirling was a rural district, surrounding but not including the coastal city of Albany. At its abolition it included the towns of Denmark, Mount Barker, Walpole and Cranbrook.

History
Stirling was first created for the 1950 state election. It was held at all times by the National Party, or factions thereof, under their various guises.

The district was abolished ahead of the 2008 state election as a result of the reduction in rural seats made necessary by the one vote one value reforms. Its former territory was largely incorporated into the new district of Blackwood-Stirling with parts also added to Albany. Following Stirling's abolition, sitting National MP Terry Redman contested the seat of Blackwood-Stirling.

Members for Stirling

Election results

External links
 
 
 

Former electoral districts of Western Australia